Epigomphus flinti is a species of dragonfly in the family Gomphidae. It is endemic to Mexico, where it is found south of Valle Nacional in Oaxaca state. Its natural habitats are subtropical or tropical moist lowland forests and rivers. It is threatened by habitat loss.

Sources

Gomphidae
Endemic insects of Mexico
Insects described in 1989
Taxonomy articles created by Polbot
Fauna of the Sierra Madre de Oaxaca